The Iceland national badminton team represents Iceland in international badminton team competitions. The national team is controlled by the national organization for badminton in Iceland, Badminton Iceland (Icelandic: Badmintonsamband Íslands).

Iceland participated in the European Men's and Women's Team Badminton Championships. Both men's and women's team have never got past the group stage.

Participation in BWF competitions

Sudirman Cup

Participation in European Team Badminton Championships

Men's Team

Women's Team

Mixed Team

Participation in Helvetia Cup 
The Helvetia Cup or European B Team Championships was a European mixed team championship in badminton. The first Helvetia Cup tournament took place in Zurich, Switzerland in 1962. The tournament took place every two years from 1971 until 2007, after which it was dissolved. The Iceland team were champions in 1999 and 2007.

Participation in European Junior Team Badminton Championships
Mixed Team

Current squad 
The following players were selected to represent Iceland at the 2020 European Men's and Women's Team Badminton Championships.

Male players
David Björnsson
Kristofer Finnsson
Kari Gunnarsson
Daniel Jóhannesson

Female players
Sigríður Árnadóttir
Erla Hafsteinsdóttir
Sólrún Ingvarsdóttir
Arna Karen Jóhannsdóttir

References

Badminton
National badminton teams
Badminton in Iceland